[[File:Schienennetzplan Frankfurt am Main.png|thumb|S-Bahn, U-Bahn and tram lines (schematic map) Additional information: between the stations Stadion and Flughafen Regionalbahnhof a further station exists, name: Frankfurt am Main gateway gardens']]

The public transit system in Frankfurt is part of the Rhein-Main-Verkehrsverbund (abbreviated: RMV) transport network and consists of several carriers who all use the same fare system. Therefore, one ticket is valid for a journey which may include several modes of transit run by different operators. 
The fares are paid in advance of travel at a ticket vending machine or at the driver on board a bus. There are no turnstiles or other controlling barriers; instead, a proof-of-payment system is used. Plainclothes fare inspectors are employed and carry out random checks to ensure passengers have paid. If found to be travelling without a ticket, then they are required to pay a fine of €60.
A single way trip within Frankfurt costs between €1.80 and €2.80, and a journey to the suburbs outside Frankfurt costs between €4.65 and €9.10 approx. There are also some discounts for children for groups or day tickets. A day ticket for traveling within Frankfurt costs €7.

 Rapid Transit

Frankfurt itself is the central city of the so-called Rhein-Main Region, and therefore the service caters the large number of commuters who travel to and from the suburbs each day.
The suburban rail service is provided by rapid transit trains (S-Bahn). All but one of the lines run together in a single underground section through the city centre, and then go their separate ways at either end. In the suburban sections they are generally double-tracked or share mainline tracks with other regional, long distance passenger and cargo trains.

The trains can be up to 200 m (600 ft) long and have a maximum speed of approximately 140 km/h (90 mph). Electricity supply is provided by overhead wires at the common German railroad voltage (15,000 volts AC).

The normal service interval on each of the lines is 15 or 30 min, but on the central sections a train runs approximately every 2 minutes during rush hour and the S8/S9 runs 24/7.

Frankfurt's rapid transit is very popular because it is fast. It has the added benefit of being very cost-effective for medium-distance lines with high usage.

 Trams 

There are 9 Tram lines, with trams arriving usually every 10 min. Many sections are served by two lines, combining to give a 5-minute frequency during rush-hour.

The construction of underground railways in the last decade has resulted in the trams losing some of their importance to the city's transport infrastructure. Despite this, two new sections have been constructed in recent years. It is now appreciated that trams are more attractive to the travelling public than buses and cheaper to build than underground railways. Therefore, neighbourhoods with medium transit usage are either currently served by tram routes or will be in future.

 Underground 

There are 9 Stadtbahn lines known as the U-Bahn.
The U1–U3 run from the southern railway station to the north of the city on a common route. They then split and serve Nordweststadt (U1) the town of Bad Homburg-Gonzenheim (U2) and the town of Oberursel (U3)
The U4 runs from Bockenheimer Warte, through the fair, the main train station, the city centre to Bornheim (Frankfurt am Main) Seckbacher Landstraße.  Since June 2008 every 2nd or 3rd train continues to Schäfflestraße with connection to the U7. This route has been the only line which runs entirely underground, except from the part behind Seckbacher Landstraße.
The U5 is a combined tram and underground line heading from Preungesheim to the city centre. There it co-shares four underground stations with the U4.
The U6 runs from Heerstraße in the west, to Ostbahnhof (East Station) in the east.
The U7 runs from Hausen in the west, to Bergen-Enkheim in the north-east.
The U8 and U9 serve a new connecting section between the U2 and U3 northern ends. U8 goes from Riedberg in the new section of track to Frankfurt-Süd sharing the tracks with U1-3. U9 starts from the north at Nieder-Eschbach on the (shared) U2 line and goes along the new track that it shares with U8, then along a short section of U3, and finally connecting to the U1 tracks to Ginnheim in Nordweststadt.

In city centre sections the rail tracks are underground, but run on their own separated section at ground level in the suburbs.
The minimum service interval is 2.5 minutes, although the usual pattern is that each line runs with a 7.5- to 10-minute frequency which combines to approx 3–5 minutes on the city centre sections served by more than one line.

The trains can be as long as 300 ft (100 m) and have a maximum speed of approximately 50 miles per hour (80 km/h). Cars are equipped with indicators and rear view mirrors and are powered from overhead wires.

There are several extension projects planned for the future, especially proposals to establish a full-fledged underground system. As this would be rather expensive, it will probably not be built in the near future, if at all. Even so, history shows that Frankfurt's underground network has always grown slower than was planned.

 Bus 

Buses play a minor role in Frankfurt transit since all major routes are served by rail based modes of transportation. There are, however, several cross-town bus routes, especially in the north. Buses are also used as feeder services for the underground lines and operate.

 Local trains 

Local trains connect Frankfurt with small towns and villages up to a distance of 80 Kilometers. Most local trains have more than one station in the city area of Frankfurt and they also can be used for rides inside the city. Categoriers for local trains in Germany are Regionalbahn (RB) and Regionalexpress (RE).

 Ferry 

There is only one ferry line in Frankfurt, it runs in the district Hoechst between the stations Frankfurt-Hoechst Batterie" and Frankfurt-Schwanheim Höchster Weg'".

Organisational structure
Rapid transit is run by Deutsche Bahn, the national German railroad operator.
Light rail and trams are run by the city owned Frankfurt Transit Company (Verkehrsgesellschaft Frankfurt) (abbreviated: VGF).
Buses are run by Verkehrsgesellschaft Frankfurt, In Der City Bus, MainMobil Frankfurt, Alpina and Regionalverkehr Kurhessen.

The fare structure and distribution between the operators is organised by the Rhein-Main-Verkehrsverbund.

 Station to change to long distance transport 

 Long distance trains stop at the stations Hauptbahnhof (central station), Südbahnhof (south station) as well as Flughafen-Fernbahnhof (airport/ long distance trains) Long distance busses stop at Fernbusbahnhof Frankfurt am Main (long distance bus terminal) as well as busstation Airport Terminal 2''
 there is no ferry traffic for long distance services
 The airport can be reached by lines S8, S9 of S-Bahn Frankfurt as well as citybus line 58 (Frankfurt-Hoechst train station - Airport Terminal 2)

Franchises
There are currently proposals for a shake-up of the way bus services are run. Instead of being operated by Frankfurt Transit Company, the routes could be split into different franchises for which any European bus operator may tender to run. The organisation offering the cheapest proposal would then be given a contract to run that route for several years.

See also
Rhein-Main-Verkehrsverbund
Rhine-Main S-Bahn
Frankfurt U-Bahn
Trams in Frankfurt am Main

External links
Information on schedules and anything else
Frankfurt Transit Company (English index)
Information on transit planning in Frankfurt

Frankfurt
Transport in Frankfurt
Public transport in Germany